Jennifer Ciurluini (born January 16, 1956 in Toronto), known professionally as Jennifer Dale, is a Canadian actress.

Biography 
She is the sister of Canadian actress Cynthia Dale. From 1980 to 1986 she was married to Robert Lantos; they have two children, Sabrina and Ariel.

In 1987, she appeared in the docudrama Hoover vs. the Kennedys: The Second Civil War, which deals with a feud between J. Edgar Hoover and the Kennedys, as First Lady Jacqueline Kennedy.

She also voiced a character in Resident Evil 2, Annette Birkin.

In 2003, she received the Earle Grey Award recognizing her lifetime achievements in the Canadian entertainment industry.

Filmography

Film

Television

Video games

References

External links
 
 Jennifer Dale, The Canadian Encyclopedia
 

1956 births
Living people
Canadian voice actresses
Canadian film actresses
Canadian television actresses
Canadian video game actresses
Actresses from Toronto
20th-century Canadian actresses
21st-century Canadian actresses